Graphomoa is a monotypic genus of North American dwarf spiders containing the single species, Graphomoa theridioides. It was first described by Ralph Vary Chamberlin in 1924, and has only been found in Alabama, Florida, Georgia, Louisiana, and Tennessee.

See also
 List of Linyphiidae species (A–H)

References

Linyphiidae
Monotypic Araneomorphae genera
Spiders of the United States